Petunia asteroid mosaic virus (PetAMV) is a plant pathogenic virus of the family Tombusviridae, infecting grapevine.

References

External links 
 Family Groups - The Baltimore Method

Tombusviridae
Viral grape diseases